Krichim Peak is an ice-covered peak of elevation 500 m in Vidin Heights on Varna Peninsula, Livingston Island, an island in the South Shetland Islands, Antarctica.  Surmounting Saedinenie Snowfield to the northwest and Panega Glacier to the southeast. The peak is named after the town of Krichim in Southern Bulgaria.

Location

Maps
 L.L. Ivanov et al. Antarctica: Livingston Island and Greenwich Island, South Shetland Islands. Scale 1:100000 topographic map. Sofia: Antarctic Place-names Commission of Bulgaria, 2005.
 L.L. Ivanov. Antarctica: Livingston Island and Greenwich, Robert, Snow and Smith Islands. Scale 1:120000 topographic map.  Troyan: Manfred Wörner Foundation, 2009.

References
 Krichim Peak. SCAR Composite Antarctic Gazetteer
 Bulgarian Antarctic Gazetteer. Antarctic Place-names Commission. (details in Bulgarian, basic data in English)

External links
 Krichim Peak. Copernix satellite image

Mountains of Livingston Island